Palaeocybe is a fungal genus  in the family Psathyrellaceae. The genus is monotypic, containing the single fossil species Palaeocybe striata, which was found in Tertiary amber in Saxony, Germany. The holotype consists of a single cap measuring 1.6 mm in diameter, and part of a stem, which is made of tubes. On the cap underside are decurrent gills

References

External links
 

Paleogene fungi
Monotypic Agaricales genera
Psathyrellaceae